Wolf Roth  (born August 30, 1944) is a German theatre and television actor.

Early life and education
Roth was born in Torgau, Germany, where his family had fled during World War II. He was raised and educated in Bremen. In 1961 he moved to the United States and graduated from the Edsel Ford High School in Detroit, Michigan. He spent the next months travelling through the Midwest of the U.S.

Career
Having returned to Germany, he graduated in Bremen and went on to the Freie Universität in Berlin. He took courses in sociology and economics, but found his vocation when he was taken by friends to the entrance examinations of the famous Max Reinhardt Seminar for actors. He was discovered by the actress Hilde Körber, and while still in the seminar, he was seen and engaged by Boleslaw Barlog. He made his theatrical debut in the play Quadratur des Kreises by Walentin Petrowitsch Katajew in 1967.  Subsequently he joined the theatre in Oberhausen, where he portrayed several roles. He left Oberhausen in 1969 to continue his career in Berlin, where he played in the Berliner Theater and the Schaubühne. During this time, he started to work in television and the movies, where his main work has been since then. Films include Goldene Zeiten (2006) (as the character Jürgen Matthies).

Theatre
 Quadratur des Kreises by Walentin Petrowitsch Katajew,  Schiller-Theater Werkstatt Berlin, 1967
 Half Way Up a Tree by Peter Ustinov, "Robert", Oberhausen, 1967/68
 Die Dreigroschenoper by Bertold Brecht, "Filch", Oberhausen, 1967/68
 Das Staatsexamen by Alexander Wampilow, "Koljossow", Oberhausen, 1967/68
 La belle Hélène by Jacques Offenbach, "Paris", Oberhausen, 1967/68
 Kaspar by Peter Handke (world première), "Einsager", Oberhausen, 11.5.1968
 Die Räuber by Friedrich Schiller, "Franz Moor", Oberhausen, 1968
 The Knack by Ann Jellicoe, "Tolen", Oberhausen, 1968
 Avanti! by Samuel A. Taylor, directed by Victor de Kowa, "Baldo Pantaleone" with Günter Pfitzmann, Berliner Theater, 1969

Piano concerts

 In his youth Wolf Roth studied to become a professional pianist. At the age of 12 he gave his first concert with Mozart, at the age of 14 he played his first Beethoven concert and at the age of 16, when in the U.S., he played the Warsaw Concerto by Richard Addinsell and the Rhapsody in Blue by George Gershwin before audiences. As Franz Moor in Die Räuber he had to play the piano on stage (it was a modern dress production) and was so good, that it was almost impossible to convince the critics and the audience, that they were watching a 'live performance' and not listening to an audio recording.

Selected films
 , directed by Alfred Vohrer (1971), as Nick
 Ich werde dich töten, Wolf, directed by Wolfgang Petersen (1971), as Wolf
 Der kleine Doktor (1974, German television series, 1 episode), as Philippe
 One or the Other of Us, directed by Wolfgang Petersen (1974), as Hohenberg
 Quincy, M.E. (1977, US television series, 1 episode), as Müller
  (1978), as Porfirio Perez
 Fleisch (1979), as Bill
 Derrick - Season 10, Episode 1: "Via Genua" (1983), as Achim Huber
 Derrick - "Ein Spiel mit dem Tod" (1984), as Ulrich Hossner
 Cover Up (1985, US television series, 1 episode), as Nicholas
 Scarecrow and Mrs. King (1985, US television series, 1 episode), as Hans Retzig
 Derrick - "Entlassen Sie diesen Mann nicht!" (1986), as Dr. Kraus
 Derrick - "Höllensturz" (1990), as Arnold Kiesing
 Derrick - "Caprese in der Stadt" (1991), as Gaug
 Derrick - "Der Schrei" (1991), as Simon Krüger
 Derrick - "Die seltsame Sache Liebe" (1993), as Seidel
 Derrick - "Gib dem Mörder nicht die Hand" (1994), as Gerhard Schumann
 Derrick - "Abendessen mit Bruno" (1994), as Herr Mandy
 Derrick - "Ein Mord, zweiter Teil" (1995), as Rudolf Kollau
 Derrick - "Eines Mannes Herz" (1995), as Arnold Bertram
 Derrick - "Die Ungerührtheit der Mörder" (1995), as Professor Weiland
 Derrick - "Mama Kaputtke" (1998), as Herr Reuter
 Goldene Zeiten (2006), as Jürgen Matthies
 Fantastic Beasts: The Crimes of Grindelwald (2018), as Spielman

References

External links

1944 births
Living people
People from Torgau
People from the Province of Saxony
German male television actors
German male stage actors